Martin Vechev is a professor at the Department of Computer Science at ETH Zurich working in the fields of programming languages, machine learning, and security. He leads the Secure, Reliable, and Intelligent Systems Lab (SRI), part of the Department of Computer Science. He is known for his pioneering works in machine learning for code (BigCode), where he introduced statistical programming engines trained on large codebases, reliable and trustworthy artificial intelligence, where he introduced abstract interpretation methods for reasoning about deep neural networks to enable the verification of large machine learning models, and quantum programming, introducing the first high-level programming language and system Silq.

Vechev has received the ACM SIGPLAN Robin Milner Young Researcher Award in 2019 and a highly-visible ERC Starting Grant, which helped shape the area of machine learning for code. In 2016, his Ph.D. student Veselin Raychev received an Honorable Mention for the ACM Doctoral Dissertation Award and in 2021 his Ph.D. student Gagandeep Singh received the ACM SIGPLAN Doctoral Dissertation Award.

Vechev has also co-founded the deep tech start-ups LatticeFlow, DeepCode, and ChainSecurity.

Early life and education 
Martin Vechev was born in Sofia, Bulgaria, where he attended the Sofia High School of Mathematics (SMG) from 1991 to 1994. He received a B.Sc. in Computer Science from Simon Fraser University in 2001 and a Ph.D. in computer science from the University of Cambridge in 2008. Prior to starting at ETH Zurich in 2012, Vechev was a Research Staff Member at the IBM T.J. Watson Research Center in New York, USA in the period 2007-2011.

Career 
He has been in a group at ETH Zurich that has resulted in the creation of popular systems:

 JSNice, DeGuard, and DeBIN, statistical deobfuscators for javascript, Android apps, and binary executables.
 ETH Robustness Analyzer for Neural Networks (ERAN), a sound, precise, and scalable robustness verifier for deep neural networks based on abstract interpretation.
 Silq, the first high-level programming language for quantum computing with a strong static type system 
 PSI Solver, an exact inference engineer for probabilistic programs
 ELINA, a state-of-the-art library for numerical abstract domains for static analysis
 Securify and VerX, static analyzer and automated verifier for Ethereum smart contracts
 SyNET, NetComplete, NetDice: systems for deterministic and probabilistic verification and synthesis for computer networks

He has also co-founded the deep tech start-ups:

 LatticeFlow, building the world’s first platform for delivering robust and trustworthy AI systems.
 DeepCode, the first AI-based code review system, acquired by the security unicorn Snyk in 2020.
 and ChainSecurity, smart contract security audits based on formal mathematical guarantees, acquired by PwC Switzerland in 2020.

Awards 
 ACM SIGPLAN Robin Milner Young Researcher Award in 2019 for major contributions to the area of programming languages;
 ACM SIGPLAN Research Highlight;
 CACM Research Highlight 2016;
 ERC Starting Grant for the project BIGCODE, the first to combine advanced programming languages and machine learning techniques, which developed new AI-based methods for creating and debugging software;
 Outstanding Artifact Award (OOPSLA 2013);
 John Atanasoff Award 2009, awarded by the President of Bulgaria;

References

Living people
Programming language researchers
Academic staff of ETH Zurich
1977 births